Since the advent of Scouting in 1907, Scouts have been depicted on the postage stamps of almost every nation during different times of their political development.

The Scouts on Stamps Society International, or SOSSI was created as a response to stamp collectors who want to specialize in the field of Scouting in their collections in particular.

Individual nations have organizations for Scout philatelists as well.
Association Française des Collectionneurs de Timbres Scouts (AFCTS)-French Scouts on Stamps Association

See also

Scouting memorabilia collecting

External links

Official site
Scouts on Stamps at www.stampnews.com

Philatelic organizations
Scouting-related associations